The Hamburg University of Applied Sciences (German: Hochschule für Angewandte Wissenschaften Hamburg) is a higher education and applied research institution located in Hamburg, Germany. Formerly known as Fachhochschule Hamburg, the Hamburg University of Applied Sciences was founded in 1970. In terms of student enrolment, the HAW is the second-largest university in Hamburg and the forth-largest applied sciences university in Germany, with a student body of 16.879.

History 
The Hamburg University of Applied Sciences was founded in 1970 as the Fachhochschule Hamburg. Four engineering schools and six vocational schools were brought together with the goal of developing a new form of higher education. The focus was on the application of knowledge, with degree programmes that included placements in industry, laboratory work and practice-related projects.

The Fachhochschule Hamburg initially had 13 departments. Its Business School was founded in 1994.

In 1998, as part of the increased internationalisation within higher education in Germany, the Conference of the Ministers of Education and Cultural Affairs allowed the Fachhochschulen to add 'university of applied sciences' to their names. In 2001, the Fachhochschule Hamburg decided to take this a step further and changed its German name to Hochschule für Angewandte Wissenschaften Hamburg (HAW Hamburg), which more closely reflected the English name, Hamburg University of Applied Sciences.

All of the Bachelor's programmes offered at the university are taught in German, with the exception of Information Engineering, which offers both English and German options.

At the end of 2007, the Faculty of Business and Public Management and the Faculty of Social Work and Nursing were joined to form one faculty. Today the university has four faculties at four different campus locations in Hamburg:

 Engineering and Computer Science
 Life Sciences
 Design, Media and Information
 Business and Social Sciences

As of 1 January 2006, the Architecture, Civil Engineering and Geomatics departments joined the building faculties of two other Hamburg universities to become the new HafenCity University.

Faculties

Business and Social Sciences [Berliner Tor Campus]
Design, Media and Information [Armgartstrasse/Finkenau Campus]
Engineering and Computer Science [Berliner Tor Campus]
Life Sciences [Bergedorf Campus]

Research
Energy and Sustainability
Biomass
Environmental Analysis and Ecotoxicology
Fuel Cells
Lifetec Process Engineering
Health and Nutrition
Biomedical Systems/Networks in Diagnostics
Evaluation Research in Social, Health and Education Sectors
Food Science
Public Health
Mobility and Transport
New Flight
AERO - Aircraft, Design, and Systems Group
Driver Assistance and Autonomous Systems (FAUST)
Application of Dynamic Systems (ADYS)
IT, Communication and Media
Ambient Intelligence
iNET - Internet Technologies Research Group 
Interactive Multimedia Systems
Knowledge Access and Accessibility
Information and the Development of the Internet
MARS - Multi-Agent Research and Simulation
Sound Analysis and Design
Visual Thinking
Games
Diverse Research Activities
Dynamics and Interactions of Fluid and Structures (DISS)
Optical Sensing and Image Processing
Innovation in Medium Sized Companies
Family Relationships/Children at Risk
Integrated Industrial Business Processes

Partnerships
HAW Hamburg has partnerships with various other universities, including the University of Shanghai for Science and Technology (China), the University of Huelva (Spain) and the Institute of Technology Tallaght in Dublin (Ireland). A 'joint college' collaboration between HAW Hamburg and the University of Shanghai for Science and Technology offers Mechanical Engineering and Electrical Engineering degree courses to Chinese students. A third of the courses take place at the University of Shanghai campus.

HAW Hamburg partners with California State University – Long Beach (CSULB) every fall and summer for a short-term study abroad programme. German students host CSULB students in the summer and are hosted in the fall in return .

HAW Hamburg also partners with the Department of Aerospace and Ocean Engineering at Virginia Tech.

Campuses
The HAW has four campuses. The main campus and official address is in St. Georg; the Bergedorf Campus is in Lohbrügge.

See also

 Education in Hamburg

References

External links

 Hamburg University of Applied Sciences 
 Official Campus Locations 

 
Educational institutions established in 1970
Buildings and structures in Hamburg-Mitte
1970 establishments in West Germany
Universities of Applied Sciences in Germany
Universities and colleges in Hamburg